Rahmanabad (also Romanized as Raḩmānābād) is a village in Howmeh Rural District, in the Central District of Iranshahr County, Sistan and Baluchestan Province, Iran. At the 2006 census, its population was 105, in 16 families.

References 

Populated places in Iranshahr County